Abbott Paige "Jack" Mills (October 23, 1889 – June 3, 1973) was a Major League Baseball third baseman who played for one season. He played for the Cleveland Naps during the 1911 Cleveland Naps season. He graduated from Williams College in 1911.

References

External links

1889 births
1973 deaths
Major League Baseball third basemen
Cleveland Naps players
Baseball players from Massachusetts
New Orleans Pelicans (baseball) players
Williams Ephs baseball players